Shelly Centre is a South African shopping centre located in Shelly Beach, KwaZulu-Natal. Shelly Centre serves the Lower South Coast (from Hibberdene to Port Edward). Shelly Centre has 70 stores.

History 
On 23 August 1985, Shelly Centre was opened by residents of the South Coast due to the fact that it was the South Coast's first major shopping mall. It also made Shelly Beach the first place on the Lower South Coast to boast an escalator.

In 2015, a multi-million rand upgrade took place at Shelly Centre to modernise the shopping centre as the last upgrade was done in 2003. The upgrade was aimed to create a consistent look and modern feel using wood and natural elements. In 2018, new logo to the shopping centre was introduced.

Mall contents 
Shelly Centre has 6 movie theatres operated by SterKinekor, 10 restaurants and eateries, more than 70 stores in total, undercover parking and non-undercover parking.

Anchor tenants in Shelly Centre include PicknPay, Woolworths, Truworths, Edgars and SterKinekor.

References 

Shopping centres in South Africa
Economy of KwaZulu-Natal
Ugu District Municipality